Hugo Córdova or Córdoba was a Bolivian chess player.

Biography
In the 1930s Hugo Córdova was one of Bolivia's leading chess players. He represented Bolivia at the 1938 Bolivarian Games.

Hugo Córdova played on first board for Bolivia in the 8th Chess Olympiad in Buenos Aires in 1939, scoring two wins, one draw, and thirteen losses.

References

Further reading

External links

Hugo Córdova chess games at 365chess.com

Year of birth missing
Year of death missing
Bolivian chess players
Chess Olympiad competitors
20th-century chess players